The 1949 Star World Championship was held in Chicago, United States in 1949.

Results

References

Star World Championships
1949 in sailing
Star World Championships in the United States
1949 in American sports